Jungle Headhunters is a 1951 American documentary film produced by Julian Lesser, which covers an expedition through Central and South America by the explorer Lewis Cotlow.

References

American documentary films
1951 documentary films
1951 films
Films scored by Paul Sawtell
1950s American films